Robert Jensen Bryan (born October 29, 1934) is a senior United States district judge of the United States District Court for the Western District of Washington.

Education and career

Born in Bremerton, Washington, Bryan was in the United States Army Reserve from 1955 to 1957, and received a Bachelor of Arts degree from the University of Washington in 1956, where he was a member of the Delta Upsilon fraternity. He earned a Juris Doctor from the University of Washington School of Law in 1958. He was in private practice in Bremerton from 1959 to 1967. He was then a judge on the Superior Court of Washington from 1967 to 1984, including service as a judge pro tem, Washington State Court of Appeals in 1975 and as a judge pro tem on the Washington State Supreme Court from 1979 to 1982. He was in private practice in Seattle, Washington from 1984 to 1986.

Federal judicial service

On February 3, 1986, Bryan was nominated by President Ronald Reagan to a new seat on the United States District Court for the Western District of Washington created by 98 Stat. 333. He was confirmed by the United States Senate on April 24, 1986, and received his commission on May 7, 1986. He assumed senior status on November 1, 2000.

References

Sources
 

1943 births
Living people
Judges of the United States District Court for the Western District of Washington
United States district court judges appointed by Ronald Reagan
20th-century American judges
United States Army soldiers
University of Washington School of Law alumni
University of Washington alumni
University of Washington Delta Upsilon alumni
Superior court judges in the United States
21st-century American judges